The Australian Total Diet Survey, formerly known as the Australian Market Basket Survey, is an assessment of consumers' dietary exposure to pesticide residues, contaminants, and other substances.

References

External links 
23rd Australian Total Diet Study
22nd Australian Total Diet Study
21st Australian Total Diet Study (Full report)
20th Australian Total Diet Survey report (HTML)
20th Australian Total Diet Survey report (PDF)
19th Australian Total Diet Survey (HTML)
Eating Disorders in Australia

Australian medical research
Environment of Australia
Health surveys